The 56th running of the Tour of Flanders cycling race in Belgium was held on Sunday 9 April 1972. Belgian Eric Leman won ahead of André Dierickx and Frans Verbeeck, winning the classic for the second time. The race started in Ghent and finished in Gentbrugge. 80 out of 171 riders arrived.

Course
The race was run in bad weather, leading to a group of 30. Eddy Merckx and Eric Leman broke away from the group, but Felice Gimondi brought the rest back. Merckx, suffering severe back pain, was forced to walk up the Muur van Geraardsbergen, but returned afterwards. At 10 km from the finish, a group of seven was formed, sprinting for the win. Leman narrowly beat André Dierickx. Merckx finished seventh.

Climbs
There were six categorized climbs:

Results

References

Tour of Flanders
Tour of Flanders
Tour of Flanders
Tour of Flanders
1972 Super Prestige Pernod